The Qinshan Nuclear Power Plant (秦山核电站) is a multi-unit nuclear power plant in Qinshan Town, Haiyan County, in Jiaxing, Zhejiang province, China.

Development 
The construction of the units involved three separate phases.

Phase I Involved construction of the small-scale (≈300 MW) Unit-1 only, but was the first domestically designed and constructed nuclear power plant in the nation (95 percent of components came from domestic manufactures).

Phase II The next set of reactors were mid-scale plants (≈600 MW) but still of Chinese design (CNP-600). The steam generators were made by Babcock & Wilcox of Cambridge, Ontario, Canada.

Phase III Involved construction of two 728 MW (gross) CANDU-6 series of the CANDU reactor design supplied by Atomic Energy of Canada Limited. This was reported to be the largest business venture between Canada and China to that time. In 2001, it was visited by the Canadian Prime Minister Jean Chrétien; both units were online by 2003.

Although Fangjiashan Nuclear Power Plant is technically a separate entity from Qinshan, the World Nuclear Association considers it to essentially be an extension of the Qinshan plant due to their proximity and the fact that the original two reactors built at Fangjiashan were initially intended to be built at Qinshan phase IV (which is no longer planned).

Reactor data

In 2019 Qinshan 1 was upgraded and uprated to 350 MWe (net) from its original output power of 300 MWe.

See also

 Fangjiashan Nuclear Power Plant
 List of power stations in China
 Nuclear power in China

References

Nuclear power stations in China
Nuclear power stations using CANDU reactors
Nuclear power stations using pressurized water reactors
Jiaxing